The 75th running of the Tour of Flanders cycling classic was held on Sunday, 7 April 1991. Edwig Van Hooydonck won the race, his second after 1989. The race was the second leg of the UCI Road World Cup. 102 of 194 riders finished.

Race report
A group of 24 riders, containing all favourites, were in front after the Molenberg. Edwig Van Hooydonck, Johan Museeuw, Rolf Sørensen ad Rolf Gölz broke away on Tenbosse in Brakel. Van Hooydonck tried to drop his companions on the Muur van Geraardsbergen, before really going solo on the Bosberg, the ultimate climb of the day, and powering on to the finish. Museeuw won the sprint for second place before Sørensen. Sørensen was the new leader in the World Cup.

Route
The race started in Sint-Niklaas and finished in Meerbeke (Ninove) – totaling 261 km.
The course featured 14 categorized climbs:

Results

External links
 Video of the 1991 Tour of Flanders  on Sporza (in Dutch)

References

Tour of Flanders
Tour of Flanders
Tour of Flanders
Tour of Flanders
1991 UCI Road World Cup